The Women's African Volleyball Clubs Championship is an international women's club volleyball competition organized by the African Volleyball Confederation. It is the most important continental women's club volleyball competition in Africa and was first contested in 1986, it was not held for few years during the 1990s, but tournaments have been held every year since 1997.

Winners of the competition qualified as continental champions for the FIVB Volleyball Women's Club World Championship between 2010 and 2014.

Results

Source: CAVB

Wins by club

* Includes club's accomplishments under former names (MC Alger and MP Alger).

Wins by country

References

External links
 Women's African Clubs Championship (volleyball) – goalzz.com

International volleyball competitions
International women's volleyball competitions
African international sports competitions
Recurring sporting events established in 1986
Multi-national professional sports leagues